Lunch is the fourth album by the British art rock band Audience, released in 1972. It was their last original release following the departure of Keith Gemmell and the band's breaking up for more than 30 years. It peaked at 175 on the Billboard 200 chart.

Track listing
Unless otherwise noted, all tracks are credited to Howard Werth and Trevor Williams.

Side one
 "Stand by the Door" (Werth) - 3:56
 "Seven Sore Bruises" - 2:37
 "Hula Girl" (Gemmell, Werth) - 2:40
 "Ain't the Man You Need" - 3:20
 "In Accord" (Connor, Gemmell, Williams)- 4:55

Side two
 "Barracuda Dan" - 2:15
 "Thunder and Lightnin'" (Werth) - 3:37
 "Party Games" - 3:20
 "Trombone Gulch" - 2:43
 "Buy Me An Island" (Werth) - 5:10

Personnel
Tony Connor - drums, vibes and marimba
Trevor Williams - bass guitar, accordion and vocals
Howard Werth - vocals and guitar
Keith Gemmell - tenor saxophone, clarinet, recorder and flute
Nick Judd - piano
Bobby Keys - tenor saxophone
Jim Price - trumpet and trombone
Gus Dudgeon - producer
David Hentschel - engineer
Hipgnosis - sleeve design

References

Audience (band) albums
1972 albums
Albums with cover art by Hipgnosis
Albums produced by Gus Dudgeon
Charisma Records albums
Elektra Records albums
Albums recorded at Trident Studios